Rick Ray Mathews (born 1947) is an American professional baseball scout for the Colorado Rockies and the former (1993; 1995; 2003–2008) bullpen coach for the club.

Education and early career
In 1969, Mathews graduated from Drake University, where he was a pitcher on the Drake baseball team. He was a high school and junior college baseball coach, as well as a part-time scout for the Kansas City Royals (1971–74) and Philadelphia Phillies (1974–77). Notable members of the high school team he coached in Cincinnati Iowa include Michael Baughman. He then became a minor league manager in the Kansas City organization, with posts in Charleston (1981), Ft. Myers (1982–83), Memphis (1984) and Eugene (1987). He also was Kansas City's Assistant Director of Player Development (1985–86). From 1988 to 1990, Mathews was the Royals' traveling minor league instructor.

Mathews joined the Rockies in the summer of 1992 as the pitching coach at Mesa of the Arizona Rookie League. He was then slated to work at Bend the following season but coached in the big league bullpen for most of the year. He was Colorado's bullpen coach for a large portion of the inaugural season of 1993 and then again in 1995. He then spent seven years as Colorado's roving minor league pitching coordinator 
before his third stint on the Rockies' Major League staff.

Current career
Mathews is currently a pro scout for the Rockies based in Centerville, Iowa. During a ceremony at city hall on Friday morning, November 9, 2007, Mayor Greg Fenton proclaimed “Rick Mathews Day” in Centerville. The proclamation was spearheaded by former CHS classmate Kris Koestner. Mathews graduated from Centerville High School (Centerville, Iowa), in 1965 and was cited in the weeks following the Rockies'  National League championship season. Mathews was honored with the proclamation for his many years of dedication and helping the community of Centerville and also for his success in Major League Baseball.

Mathews’ pro experience dates back to the 1970s. After playing at Indian Hills Community College in the late 1960s, Mathews returned to IHCC to coach the Falcons in 1987. He spent six seasons at IHCC before joining the Rockies.
 
“I choose to live in Centerville, Iowa,” commented Mathews. “I could live anywhere in the United States. I choose to live here because I love the community, I grew up in Cincinnati, Iowa – my family still lives there. I moved back here 24 years ago to raise my family and have my kids graduate from Centerville High School (Centerville, Iowa). My wife, Mary Louise, is from here and we’ll spend the rest of our time here. This is home. Thank you very much, it means a great deal to myself and my family,” added Mathews.

“Rick has a true love for the game of baseball and has for many years touched not only Centerville youth but youth throughout Iowa playing the game of baseball by working with Little League Baseball and holding pitching and hitting camps and working with Indian Hills Community College students,” said Centerville Mayor Greg Fenton while reading from the official proclamation. “I, Greg Fenton, mayor of Centerville, hereby proclaim Nov. 9, 2007, as Rick Mathews Day and call upon and urge all citizens to recognize Rick Mathews for the many years of faithful dedication to baseball and patronage in the Centerville community.”

Personal life
Mathews and his wife, Mary Louise, have a son, Jonathan, a minor league hitting instructor in the Arizona Diamond Backs organization, and a daughter, Sarah, a sixth-grade teacher. They also have five grandkids Elizabeth, Merrick, Claire, Emma, and Sophie.

References

External links 
 Colorado Rockies profile
 Woody Paige, "Great view of new glory", The Denver Post, Sept. 30, 2007

1947 births
Living people
Colorado Rockies (baseball) coaches
Colorado Rockies scouts
Eugene Emeralds managers
Major League Baseball bullpen coaches
Indian Hills Falcons baseball players
Drake Bulldogs baseball players
People from Centerville, Iowa